Quirine Oosterveld (born , Almere) is a Dutch female volleyball player. She is a member of the Netherlands women's national volleyball team and played for Alterno Apeldoorn in 2014. 

She was part of the Dutch national team at the 2014 FIVB Volleyball Women's World Championship in Italy.

Clubs
  Alterno Apeldoorn (2014)

References

1990 births
Living people
Dutch women's volleyball players
Sportspeople from Almere
20th-century Dutch women
21st-century Dutch women